Judge Russell may refer to:

Dan Monroe Russell Jr. (1913–2011), judge of the United States District Court for the Southern District of Mississippi
George L. Russell III (born 1965), judge of the United States District Court for the District of Maryland
David Lynn Russell (born 1942), judge of the United States District Courts for the Eastern, Northern, and Western Districts of Oklahoma
Donald S. Russell (1906–1998), judge of the United States Court of Appeals for the Fourth Circuit
Gordon J. Russell (1859–1919), judge of the United States District Court for the Eastern District of Texas
Robert Lee Russell (1900–1955), judge of the United States Court of Appeals for the Fifth Circuit
Thomas B. Russell (born 1945), judge of the United States District Court for the Western District of Kentucky

See also
Justice Russell (disambiguation)